The Pink Panther: Music from the Film Score Composed and Conducted by Henry Mancini is a soundtrack album from the 1963 movie The Pink Panther starring David Niven and Peter Sellers. The music was composed and conducted by Henry Mancini. 

The album entered Billboard magazine's pop album chart on April 25, 1964, peaked at No. 8, and remained on the chart for 41 weeks. 

The title song, "The Pink Panther Theme" was released as a single. It reached the Top 10 on the U.S. Billboard adult contemporary chart. The distinctive tenor saxophone of Plas Johnson is heard on the main title theme music.

The album and title song were nominated for the Grammy Awards for Best Album or Original Score and Best Pop Instrumental Performance. It was also nominated for an Academy Award for best score, losing out to Mary Poppins.

AllMusic gave the album a rating of four-and-a-half stars. Reviewer Stephen Cook called it a fine soundtrack and concluded: "This is a great title for fans of Mancini's lounge/soundtrack material, but those more into his jazz material should consider either his Peter Gunn or Combo soundtracks."

In 2001, the soundtrack album was awarded a Grammy Hall of Fame Award. In 2005, the score was listed at #20 on AFI's 100 Years of Film Scores.

Track listing

Personnel
Plas Johnson - tenor saxophone
Gene Cipriano, Harry Klee, Ronny Lang, Ted Nash – flute, saxophones
Frank Beach, Conrad Gozzo, Jack Sheldon, Ray Triscari – trumpets
Karl DeKarske, Dick Nash, Jimmy Priddy – trombones
John Halliburton - bass trombone
Al Hendrickson – guitar
Larry Bunker, Frank Flynn – vibes and percussion
Jimmy Rowles – piano
Rolly Bundock – bass
Shelly Manne – drums
Carl Fortina – accordion
Ramon Rivera - congas, percussion

Certifications

References

1963 soundtrack albums
RCA Victor soundtracks
Henry Mancini albums
Albums conducted by Henry Mancini